The discography of American rapper Lil Baby consists of four studio albums, six mixtapes (including two collaborative mixtapes), and 86 singles (including 57 as a featured artist).

Albums

Studio albums

Collaborative albums

Mixtapes

Compilation albums

Singles

As lead artist

As featured artist

Other charted and certified songs

Guest appearances

Notes

References

Hip hop discographies